Tetraspanin-4 is a protein that in humans is encoded by the TSPAN4 gene.

The protein encoded by this gene is a member of the transmembrane 4 superfamily, also known as the tetraspanin family. Most of these members are cell-surface proteins that are characterized by the presence of four hydrophobic domains. The proteins mediate signal transduction events that play a role in the regulation of cell development, activation, growth and motility. This encoded protein is a cell surface glycoprotein and is similar in sequence to its family member CD53 antigen. It is known to complex with integrins and other transmembrane 4 superfamily proteins. Alternatively spliced transcript variants encoding different isoforms have been identified.

Interactions
TSPAN4 has been shown to interact with CD9, ITGA6, CD29, CD49c and CD81.

References

Further reading